Jake Traeger is an American retired soccer player.

College career
Traeger played college soccer for the Ohio State Buckeyes.  He was team MVP, first-team all-Big Ten Conference, first-team all state, and second-team all region.

Professional career
Traeger was selected 58th overall in the 2003 MLS SuperDraft by the Columbus Crew and made two appearances over two seasons for the Crew.

References

External links
 

Living people
American soccer players
Columbus Crew players
Major League Soccer players
Columbus Crew draft picks
Ohio State Buckeyes men's soccer players
Association footballers not categorized by position
Year of birth missing (living people)